This is a list of all United States Supreme Court cases from volume 510 of the United States Reports:

External links

1993 in United States case law
1994 in United States case law